Cust or CUST may refer to:

Cust
 Cust (surname)
 Cust, New Zealand, a village in Canterbury
 Cust River, a river in the Canterbury region of New Zealand

CUST
 Capital University of Science & Technology, Islamabad, Pakistan
 Central University of Science and Technology, Dhaka, Bangladesh
 Changchun University of Science and Technology, a university in China
 China University of Science and Technology, a university in Taipei, Taiwan